The Vespa LX is a scooter that was made by Piaggio from 2006 until 2014.

The LX 150, like all modern Vespa scooters features a 4-stroke single overhead camshaft and steel frame construction. Vespa claims  fuel efficiency.

The LX models feature an automatic torque slave transmission and front disc and rear drum brakes.

Released in 2005, the LX is the Roman Numeral for 60, marking the sixtieth anniversary of the first Vespa scooter in 1946. The LXV, the V denoting a vintage style, was released the same year and is mechanically identical.

Introduction

Presented in February 2005 as far as the exterior is concerned, the frame is more squared than the ET2/ET4 series it intended to replace.

In 2009 it was restyled where the crest on the front fender and some chrome on the edges of the knobs and on the horn grille were added. On the occasion of this restyling, the engines became injection.

The LX, like all other Vespa scooters, has a steel supporting body that also contains a 9.8-liter tank inside; it is combined with the typical single-arm suspension on the front wheel. At the rear it has a suspension with double-acting hydraulic single shock absorber. The wheels are in five-spoke light alloy and have a diameter of 11 "front and 10" rear. The front wheel has a disc brake installed, while the rear one keeps the classic drum. To improve braking performance, the front disc brake was made of stainless steel with a diameter of approximately 200 mm and was equipped with a caliper with two opposed pistons with hydraulic control. The gearbox, like all Vespa scooters from 1996 to today (except the PX model), is of the CVT type.

In June 2009, production also started in Vietnam at the Binh Xuyen Indus plant of the local subsidiary Piaggio Vietnam Ltd. These models are sold on Asian markets.

In January 2012, production of the Vespa LX also started in India for the local market; the Indian LX features 125 single-cylinder three-valve engine and numerous set-up changes to suit local customers. Production takes place in the Baramati plant of the Piaggio Vehicles Private branch.

Vespa LX
The LX was made available in multiple displacements, 50, 125 and 150 cm³. All thrusters are forced air cooled.
The smaller displacement version is produced with both a two-stroke engine and a four-stroke engine with the latter being later enhanced with the addition of two more valves in the cylinder. The starting is electric or by means of a crank arm. The engines follow the Euro 2 directive. The maximum speed is limited to 45 km/h as per the rules governing mopeds; two-seater homologation as standard. To comply with the anti-emissions regulations, the catalyst system has been modified through the SAS secondary air recovery system. The 4-stroke Vespa 50 LX weighs 102 kg while the 2-stroke weighs just under the 4-stroke model (96 kg).

The 125 engine belongs to the Piaggio Leader family and is a four-stroke with electronic injection and has a power of 7.9 Kw (10.7 HP). With this engine, the LX reaches 91 km/h.

The highest displacement is represented by the Leader engine, also four-stroke and 151 cm³ electronic injection. This engine produces a power of 8.9 kW (12.1 hp) and the LX thus equipped reaches a top speed of 95 km/h.

In June 2012, the LX 125 and 150 models made their debut with three-valve timing and electronic injection.

The production of the LX ends in Italy in 2013 replaced by the new generation called Vespa Primavera.

Vespa S 
The Vespa S was introduced on the market in 2007, after the official presentation held at the Milan Motor Show the previous year. It derives from the LX model, from which it stands out for numerous aesthetic details, such as the rectangular headlight, the minimalist mudguard with the chromed crest, the front bow tie, the squared rear-view mirrors, the red suspension spring and the back shield with the pouch instead of the classic glove box. Some of these details, such as the rectangular headlight and the squared mirrors, recall the aesthetics of the old "Vespa 50 Special" produced in the early seventies.

At the time of its launch in 2007, the Vespa S was only available in the 50 4-stroke and 125 versions which cost, respectively, 2,500 euros and 3,200 euros in Italy. The range of colors consisted of the Rosso Dragon, Nero Lucido, Montebianco and Orange Taormina shades, the latter subsequently replaced by the Azzurro Mediterraneo color.

The range was extended in 2008 to the 50 2-stroke and 150 versions. In 2009, however, the square-shaped chromed horn cover grille was introduced, while the range was updated with the 50 4V 4-stroke, 125ie and 150ie engines. In 2010 the special Vespa S College model made its debut, available in the 50 2-stroke version with the single-seater Sport saddle, as well as in the 125ie and 150ie versions with the two-seater Touring saddle. The special College version is recognizable by the presence of the transparent windshield and by the red or blue color of the footboard, leg shield, internal part of the handlebar, side graphics and saddle in eco-leather with white stitching, in contrast with the Montebianco color of the body.

The Vespa S Sport was presented at the 2010 Milan Motor Show, available in the 50 2T, 50 4V, 125ie and 150ie versions and recognizable by the Titanium Gray bodywork, combined with the light gray side graphics and alloy wheels of matt black color. This special version was introduced on the market the following year and was confirmed also for 2012, with the range of colors extended to the Nero Abisso color combined with the saddle equipped with heat-sealed and white piping.

In 2012, the new 125ie and 150ie 3-valve engines made their debut, while the aesthetics were mainly renewed with the black finish for the horn cover and the fender crest, instead of the previous chrome. The graphics of the instrumentation and the shape of the front tie have also been updated. Finally, the standard equipment has been extended to include black 5-spoke alloy wheels and the central footboard with the Vespa logo has been introduced.

Production of the Vespa S ended at the end of 2013, replaced the following year by the Vespa Sprint.

References

External links
 Official USA product information

Piaggio Vespa
Motor scooters